The following is a timeline of the history of the city of Bratislava, Slovakia.

Prior to 17th century

 2nd C. BCE - Gerulata Roman military camp established.
 9th C. CE - Castle built.
 907 - July 4–7: Battle of Pressburg.
 1271 - Town captured by Ottokar II of Bohemia and on July 2 he signs a Peace treaty with Stephen V of Hungary.
 1286 - City taken by "lords of Kysek."
 1288 - Rathaus built.
 1291 - Town privileges granted.
 1297 - Franciscan Church consecrated.
 1405 - Free royal town status granted.
 1436 - Coat of arms of Bratislava adopted.
 1452 - St. Martin's Cathedral consecrated.
 1465 - Universitas Istropolitana established by Matthias Corvinus.
 1490 - Universitas Istropolitana closed.
 1491 - Peace treaty signed.
 1529 - Saint James's Chapel and Church of St. Michael demolished.
 1536 - City becomes capital of the Kingdom of Hungary.
 1552 - Holy Crown of Hungary housed in Pozsony Castle.
 1563 - September: Coronation of Hungarian monarchs Maximilian and Maria.
 1572
 September: Coronation of Hungarian monarch Rudolf.
 Roland Fountain installed in Main Square.
 1599 - Town Hall renovated.

17th century
 1606 - Lutheran Lyceum established.
 1608 - November: Coronation of Hungarian monarch Matthias II.
 1613 - March: Coronation of Hungarian monarch Anna of Tyrol.
 1618 - July: Coronation of Hungarian monarch Ferdinand II.
 1619 - City taken by forces of Gabriel Bethlen (until 1621).
 1622 - July: Coronation of Hungarian monarch Eleanor Gonzaga.
 1626 - Peace treaty signed.
 1632 - Prepoštský Palace built.
 1638
 Protestant church built on Franciscan Square.
 February: Coronation of Hungarian monarch Maria Anna of Spain.
 1647 - June: Coronation of Hungarian monarch Ferdinand IV.
 1655 - June: Coronation of Hungarian monarchs Eleanor Gonzaga and Leopold I.
 1661 - St. Nicholas' Church built.
 1666 - Summer Archbishop's Palace built (approximate date).
 1672 - Column of the Virgin erected.
 1680 - Chapel of Saint Rozalia built.
 1687 - December: Coronation of Hungarian monarch Joseph I.

18th century
 1704 – Rákóczi Uprising.
 1710 – Plague.
 1712 – May: Coronation of Hungarian monarch Charles III.
 1714 – October: Coronation of Hungarian monarch Elisabeth Christine of Brunswick-Wolfenbuttel.
 1727 – Trinitarian Church consecrated.
 1730 – Jesenákov Palace built.
 1741 – June: Coronation of Hungarian monarch Maria Theresa.
 1743 – Esterházy Palace built.
 1747 – Pálffy Palace built.
 1754 – Notre Dame convent founded.
 1758 – Michael's Gate rebuilt.
 1760 – Grassalkovich Palace built.
 1762 – Apponyi Palace and Balassa Palace built.
 1763 – 28 June: 1763 Komárom earthquake.
 1764 – Pressburger Zeitung begins publication.
 1765 – House of the Good Shepherd built.
 1769 – Aspremont Palace built.
 1770 – Mirbach Palace and Erdödy Palace built.
 1775
 Old fortifications dismantled.
 Palace Csaky built.
 1776 – Sad Janka Kráľa (park) established.
 1778 – Catholic cemetery established on Račianske mýto.
 1780 – Magyar hírmondó newspaper begins publication.
 1781
 Primate's Palace built.
 Protestant cemetery established on Račianske mýto.
 1783
 Presspurske Nowiny newspaper begins publication.
 Landhaus built.
 1784 – Hungarian capital city moves to Buda but remains the seat of parliament until 1848.
 1790 – November: Coronation of Hungarian monarch Leopold II.

19th century
 1802 - Hungarian parliament meetings begin.
 1805 - Peace agreement signed between France and Austria.
 1806 - Pressburg Yeshiva founded (approximate date).
 1808 - September: Coronation of Hungarian monarch Maria Ludovika of Austria-Este.
 1809 - City besieged by French forces.
 1811 - Bratislava Castle destroyed by fire. 
 1825
 September: Coronation of Hungarian monarch Caroline Augusta of Bavaria.
 Pontoon bridge constructed over Danube.
 1828 - Arena Theatre established.
 1830 - September: Coronation of Hungarian monarch Ferdinand V.
 1848 - Railway station built.
 1850 - City designated capital of Military District of Preßburg.
 1851 - Population: 43,463.
 1860 - Holy Cross church consecrated.
 1866 - July 22: Battle of Lamacs.
 1868
 Omnibuses begins operating.
 City Museum established.
 1870 - Esterházy Palace built.
 1879
 Pozsony Singing Society founded.
 Church Mena Panny Márie built.
 1885 - Johann Pálffy Palace built (approximate date).
 1886 - City Theatre built.
 1890
 Konig-Franz-Josef Bridge built.
 Population: 52,500.
 1895 - Trams begin operating.
 1898 - Pozsonyi Torna Egyesület football club formed.
 1900
 Petržalka Stadium opens.
 Population: 61,537.

20th century
 1902 - Westungarische Volksstimme newspaper begins publication.
 1903 - March: Hungarian Zionist Congress held in city.
 1908 - Church of St. Elisabeth built.
 1909 - Trolleybuses begin operating.
 1912 - Slávičie údolie cemetery established.
 1919
 City becomes part of Czechoslovakia.
 March: City renamed "Bratislava."
 Comenius University founded.
 1921 - YMCA built.
 1923
 City becomes seat of Bratislava Region.
 Vajnory Airport in operation.
 1924 - Agricultural Museum founded.
 1926 - Synagogue built.
 1928 - School of Applied Arts founded.
 1929 - Radio Symphony Orchestra formed.
 1937 - University of Technology established.
 1939 - City becomes capital of First Slovak Republic.
 1940 - College of Commerce established.
 1942 - Slovak Academy of Sciences and Botanical Garden of the Comenius University established.
 1943 - Karlova Ves village annexed to city.
 1945
 April 4: Soviet Army defeats occupying German forces.
 Old Bridge rebuilt.
 1946
 Devín, Dúbravka, Lamač, Petržalka, Rača, and Vajnory villages annexed to city.
 Nova Scena Theatre founded.
 1948
 Communists in power.
 New Town Hall built in Primate's Square.
 Slovak National Gallery established.
 1949
 Academy of Fine Arts and Design, Academy of Performing Arts, and Slovak Philharmonic established.
 Új Szó newspaper begins publication.
 1951 - M. R. Štefánik Airport opens.
 1953
 Museum of Pharmacy active.
 School of Library and Information Studies established.
 1957 - Bratislava Castle restoration begins.
 1959 - Gymnázium Jura Hronca established.
 1960
 Slavín military monument unveiled.
 Bratislava Zoo opens.
 1961 - Slovak National Museum and Bratislava City Gallery established.
 1964 - Population: 262,380 (approximate).
 1966 - Institute of Further Education of Physicians and Pharmacists relocates to Bratislava.
 1967 - Incheba built.
 1968 - August 3: Soviets sign Bratislava Declaration.
 1969 - City becomes capital of Slovak Socialist Republic.
 1970 - Ladislav Martinák becomes mayor.
 1972
 Čunovo, Devínska Nová Ves, Jarovce, Podunajské Biskupice, Rusovce, Vrakuňa, and Záhorská Bystrica villages annexed to city.
 Novy Most bridge constructed.
 1974 - Television tower constructed.
 1975 - Bratislava Jazz Days festival begins.
 1980 - Fountain installed in Námestie Slobody.
 1981 - Istropolis cultural center built.
 1983
 Central State Archives building established.
 Cappella Istropolitana chamber orchestra formed.
 1984 - Technopol built.
 1985
 Dukla Heroes' Bridge built.
 Population: 413,002 (estimate).
 1988
 March 25: Candle demonstration against communist regime.
 Tower 115 built.
 1989 - Velvet Revolution.
 1990
 Peter Kresánek becomes mayor.
 Lafranconi Bridge opens.
 Association of Slovak Archivists headquartered in city.
 1991 - Bratislava Stock Exchange founded.
 1992 - Museum of Jewish Culture established.
 1993
 City becomes capital of Slovak Republic.
 Slovak Television begins broadcasting.
 1994 - Bratislava Forest Park and Museum of Carpathian German Culture established.
 1995 - Evangelical Church opens.
 1998
 Jozef Moravčík becomes mayor.
 Bratislava-Petržalka railway station rebuilt.
 1999
 International Film Festival Bratislava begins.
 Bratislava Transport Museum opens.
 2000 - Polus City Center shopping mall opens.

21st century

 2001
 Tatracentrum built on Hodžovo námestie.
 Aupark shopping mall opens.
 Museum of Hungarian Culture in Slovakia established.
 2002
 Andrej Ďurkovský becomes mayor.
 Prievoz viaduct opens.
 National Bank of Slovakia and Chatam Sofer Memorial built.
 Slovak Medical University established.
 2003
 HIT Gallery founded.
 Church of Saint Family built.
 2004 - Slovakia joins European Union.
 2005
 Apollo Bridge opens.
 February: USA-Russia meeting held.
 Museum of Croatian Culture in Slovakia established.
 2006 - City Business Center I built.
 2007
 Sitina Tunnel and Slovak National Theatre open.
 Aupark Tower built.
 2010
 Eurovea opens.
 August 30: 2010 Bratislava shooting.
 Milan Ftáčnik becomes mayor.
 2012 - Population: 462,603.

See also
 History of Bratislava
 List of Mayors of Bratislava
 Boroughs and localities of Bratislava
 Parks and gardens in Bratislava
 List of palaces in Bratislava
 Other names of Bratislava

References

This article incorporates information from the Czech Wikipedia and the Slovak Wikipedia.

Bibliography

External links

 Europeana. Items related to Bratislava, various dates.

Years in Slovakia
 
Bratislava
Slovakia history-related lists
Bratislava